The Holy Land Experience (HLE) was registered as a Christian-based theme park in Orlando, Florida and registered non-profit corporation. HLE conducted weekly church services and bible studies for the general public. HLE's theme park recreated the architecture and themes of the ancient city of Jerusalem in 1st-century Judaea. The Holy Land Experience was owned by the Trinity Broadcasting Network.

History 

The park had its origin in a dream of Marvin Rosenthal, a Jew of Russian origin who became a Baptist pastor, founder of the missionary organization Zion's Hope, who bought land in Orlando in 1989. The park opened in February 2001.

On August 17, 2002, the Holy Land Experience Scriptorium museum opened. It featured the Van Kampen Collection of biblically related artifacts.  The collection included ancient scrolls, manuscripts, and early printed editions of the Bible. The collection was the fourth largest of its kind. The Van Kampen Collection was founded in 1986 by Robert and Judith Van Kampen. In 1994, Robert Van Kampen established a privately funded research library for the purpose of presenting the collection to the academic community as well as the general public. The Scriptorium: Center for Christian Antiquities, located in Grand Haven, MI, housed the Collection. In 2002, the Collection relocated to Orlando, where it was on loan to the Holy Land Experience.

In June 2007, the Holy Land Experience Board of Directors sold the property to the Trinity Broadcasting Network (TBN), for an estimated $37 million. The property was an estimated $8 million in debt at the time of the sale. At that time TBN planned to update the park and use the property to build a Central Florida broadcasting facility, and a movie studio in order to produce Christian films.

On August 21, 2007, former president and board member Tom Powell resigned his position to seek "new challenges." Four people remained on the park's board: Paul Crouch Sr., Jan Crouch, Paul Crouch Jr., and Matthew Crouch. Between 50 and 100 employees lost their jobs when they were cut from the payroll in October 2007. Jan Crouch was Director and CEO until her death in May 2016.

Under TBN’s ownership, The Holy Land Experience underwent construction and the addition of new landscaping, exhibits, restaurants, and theaters which feature live musical and theatrical productions. The park has also introduced weekly bible studies, church services and live cooking demonstrations. The Smile of a Child Adventure Land was added to the park exhibits. This children’s park featured exhibits and activities for children, such as a wilderness rock-climbing wall, toy store, children’s theater and craft center.

Holy Land Experience mission statement
HLE was a non-denominational Christian living biblical museum and church. Church services and bible studies were conducted by ordained pastors for the general public on a weekly basis. HLE was registered as a non-profit corporation with the Florida Department of State Division of Corporations.

Church of All Nations
In 2012, the 2,000 seat Church of All Nations auditorium opened.  The facility featured live presentations and reenactments of the passion and crucifixion of Jesus Christ, and the depiction of the resurrection and ascension of Jesus Christ to heaven. Live tapings of TBN’s flagship TV show, Praise the Lord, were also taped in the facility, in addition to concerts and church services.

Closure 
In February 2020, after a sharp decline in revenue for several years, the park announced that it would be laying off 118 employees, representing most of its staff, and would be ending all theatrical productions, restaurants and retail shops. On August 2, 2021, the property was sold to AdventHealth, which plans to redevelop the land for a new hospital.

Exhibits 

There were approximately 43 exhibits in the park.

Controversies 
In 2001, the Jewish Defense League accused the park of proselytizing Jews because the owner of Zion's Hope Park was a missionary organization. Founder Marvin Rosenthal categorically refuted this accusation.

In 2001, Orange County refused the park's tax exemption request. In 2005, a judge ruled in favor of the park because of its mission of spreading the word of God, which is not for profit and, therefore, allows it to benefit from a tax exemption. This is similar to the tax exemption for museums that present historical information on other subjects. The law prevented Orange County from collecting the alleged back taxes as well as forgiving the park $300,000 in yearly property taxes. The law required the park to offer an annual free admissions day.

See also
 Heritage USA, a defunct religious theme park.
Holy Land USA, a similar park in Connecticut.
Tierra Santa, a similar park in Argentina.
Bible Land, a roadside attraction in California.

References

External links

Holy Land Experience

AdventHealth
Christianity in Orlando, Florida
Defunct amusement parks in Florida
Museums established in 2001
Amusement parks opened in 2001
Religious museums in Florida
Defunct museums in Florida
Trinity Broadcasting Network
Tourist attractions in Orlando, Florida
Amusement parks in Greater Orlando
2001 establishments in Florida
Amusement parks in Florida
Christian museums
Museums disestablished in 2020
Amusement parks closed in 2020
2020 disestablishments in Florida